Ranam  is a 2021 Indian Kannada-language film written and directed by V Samudra, and produced by Kanakapura Srinivas starring  Chiranjeevi Sarja, Chetan Kumar and Varalaxmi Sarathkumar with a music score by Ravi Shankar and Chinna and cinematography by Niranjan Babu it was released in India on 26 March 2021. The film marks Sarja's penultimate and posthumous appearance following his untimely demise on 7 June 2020.

Plot
The story tells about four students who take it upon themselves to solve the problems being faced by farmers and decide to take on corrupt politicians.

Cast
 Chiranjeevi Sarja
 Chetan Kumar
 Varalaxmi Sarathkumar
 Rahul Dev
 Sadhu Kokila
 Deepti Sati
 Neethu Gowda
 Preeti Sharma

Production
Ranam is 21st cinema for the producer R Srinivas The film was supposed to be released in 2020 itself due to COVID-19 the move had a delayed-release.
According to the plane, the movie was supposed to be released as the first Kannada move after lockdown. Ranam will be  last film for Late Chiranjeevi Sarja

Soundtrack

Reception
Reviewing Ranam for The Times of India, Sunayana Suresh gave two stars from five. Suresh concluded: "Chiranjeevi, as the tough cop, is good, but the rest of the film does not hold up to that"

See also 
 List of films released posthumously

References

External links
 

2021 films
Indian action films
Films set in Karnataka
2020s Kannada-language films
Films shot in Karnataka
Films postponed due to the COVID-19 pandemic